"Ain't Leavin Without You" is a song by Jaheim. It was released to radio on October 23, 2009, and is the first single from his fifth studio album, Another Round. It was produced by his longtime producer Kay Gee. Songwriting duties were handled by Marcella "Precise" Brailsford, The Clutch's Balewa Muhammad and Eritza Laues. The song was inspired by an encounter with a girl that Jaheim had in a club. It samples De La Soul's hit single, "Ring Ring Ring (Ha Ha Hey)" which contains portions of The Whatnauts's "Help Is On the Way". It also samples "Act Like You Know" and "Sex With You".

Remix
The official remix features rapper and longtime friend Jadakiss, it was released on January 5, 2010. It's the final track on Another Round.

Music video
A video for the remix of Ain't Leavin Without You featuring Jadakiss was shot in January 2010 in New York City. It was released on the Atlantic Records YouTube page on February 5, 2010.

Charts

Weekly charts

Year-end charts

References

2009 singles
Jaheim songs
Songs written by Balewa Muhammad
Atlantic Records singles
2009 songs